The 1988 LEP Matchroom Professional Championship was the third and final edition of the professional invitational snooker tournament which took place between 4 and 9 October 1988 in Southend-on-Sea, England.

The tournament featured eight professional players, all part of Barry Hearn's Matchroom Sport stable. The tournament was won by Steve Davis, who defeated reigning champion Dennis Taylor 10–7 in the final, winning the first prize of £50,000. Davis also won the high break prize of £5,000 for a break of 132.

Tournament draw

References

Matchroom Professional Championship
Matchroom Professional Championship
Matchroom Professional Championship
Matchroom Professional Championship